Taiwanese singer Hebe Tien has released five studio albums and five live albums. She was a member of the Taiwanese girl-group S.H.E, and released her debut solo album, To Hebe, in 2010.

Albums

Studio albums

Live albums

Live recording series (Live in Life)

Singles

Soundtracks

References

Tien, Hebe
Tien, Hebe
Hebe Tien